

This is a list of the National Register of Historic Places listings in Columbia County, Wisconsin.

This is intended to be a complete list of the properties and districts on the National Register of Historic Places in Columbia County, Wisconsin, United States. Latitude and longitude coordinates are provided for many National Register properties and districts; these locations may be seen together in a map.

There are 56 properties and districts listed on the National Register in the county.

Current listings

|}

See also
List of National Historic Landmarks in Wisconsin
National Register of Historic Places listings in Wisconsin
Listings in neighboring counties: Adams, Dane, Dodge, Green Lake, Juneau, Marquette, Sauk

References

 
Columbia